Walter LeJeune Jean (January 2, 1898 – March 28, 1961) was a professional football player from Chillicothe, Ohio. Jean was born and began his pro career as Walter LeJeune.

College
After high school, Jean attended Bethany College, Heidelberg College and Tiffin University. During his senior year in 1922, Bethany imported four players who had played at the professional level and challenged the top teams in college football.

Pros
He made his professional debut in the National Football League in 1922 with the Akron Pros. He later played for the Green Bay Packers, Frankford Yellow Jackets, Pottsville Maroons and Milwaukee Badgers over the course of his career. In 1927, after playing in just two games with the Maroons, Jean travelled to Portsmouth, Ohio to join a team fielded by Jim Thorpe, called the Portmouth Shoe-Steels. There he served as an offensive lineman and as an assistant coach. By the end of November though, Thorpe left the team and the head coaching duties went straight to Jean.

Legacy
Jean would be the last player from Tiffin University to play in the NFL, until Nate Washington of the Pittsburgh Steelers in 2006.

Notes

1898 births
1961 deaths
Players of American football from Ohio
Akron Pros players
Frankford Yellow Jackets players
Green Bay Packers players
Milwaukee Badgers players
Pottsville Maroons players
Heidelberg University (Ohio) alumni
Tiffin University alumni